Christian Kendji Wagatsuma Ferreira (born 18 March 2000), commonly known as Kazu, is a Brazilian professional footballer who plays as a defender for Oliveirense. He is teammates with Kazuyoshi Miura, the  year old Japanese player who also goes by the name Kazu.

Personal life
Kazu is of Japanese descent with his great grandparents hailing from Osaka.

Career statistics

Club

Notes

References

2000 births
Living people
Brazilian footballers
Brazil youth international footballers
Association football defenders
Campeonato Brasileiro Série A players
Coritiba Foot Ball Club players
Grêmio Foot-Ball Porto Alegrense players
North Texas SC players
USL League One players
Expatriate soccer players in the United States
Brazilian expatriate sportspeople in the United States
Brazilian expatriate footballers
Brazilian people of Japanese descent
Paraná Clube players
Campeonato Paranaense players
U.D. Oliveirense players
Liga Portugal 2 players
Expatriate footballers in Portugal
Brazilian expatriate sportspeople in Portugal